mlpack is a machine learning software library for C++, built on top of the Armadillo library and the ensmallen numerical optimization library. mlpack has an emphasis on scalability, speed, and ease-of-use. Its aim is to make machine learning possible for novice users by means of a simple, consistent API, while simultaneously exploiting C++ language features to provide maximum performance and maximum flexibility for expert users. Its intended target users are scientists and engineers.

It is open-source software distributed under the BSD license, making it useful for developing both open source and proprietary software. Releases 1.0.11 and before were released under the LGPL license.  The project is supported by the Georgia Institute of Technology and contributions from around the world.

Miscellaneous features
Class templates for GRU, LSTM structures are available, thus the library also supports Recurrent Neural Networks.

There are bindings to R, Go, Julia, and Python. Its binding system is extensible to other languages.

Supported algorithms
Currently mlpack supports the following algorithms and models:
 Collaborative Filtering
 Decision stumps (one-level decision trees)
 Density Estimation Trees
 Euclidean minimum spanning trees
 Gaussian Mixture Models (GMMs)
 Hidden Markov Models (HMMs)
 Kernel density estimation (KDE)
 Kernel Principal Component Analysis (KPCA)
 K-Means Clustering
 Least-Angle Regression (LARS/LASSO)
 Linear Regression
 Bayesian Linear Regression
 Local Coordinate Coding
 Locality-Sensitive Hashing (LSH)
 Logistic regression
 Max-Kernel Search
 Naive Bayes Classifier
 Nearest neighbor search with dual-tree algorithms
 Neighbourhood Components Analysis (NCA)
 Non-negative Matrix Factorization (NMF)
 Principal Components Analysis (PCA)
 Independent component analysis (ICA)
 Rank-Approximate Nearest Neighbor (RANN)
 Simple Least-Squares Linear Regression (and Ridge Regression)
 Sparse Coding, Sparse dictionary learning
 Tree-based Neighbor Search (all-k-nearest-neighbors, all-k-furthest-neighbors), using either kd-trees or cover trees
 Tree-based Range Search

See also

 Armadillo (C++ library)
 List of numerical analysis software
 List of numerical libraries
 Numerical linear algebra
 Scientific computing

References

External links
 
 

C++ libraries
Data mining and machine learning software
Free computer libraries
Free mathematics software
Free science software
Free software programmed in C++
Free statistical software